Bagnan is a census town in Bagnan I CD Block of Uluberia subdivision in Howrah district in the state of West Bengal, India.

Geography
It has an average elevation of 6 metres (19 feet). It is situated between two rivers, the Damodar and the Rupnarayan.

Demographics
As per 2011 Census of India Bagnan had a total population of 10,996 of which 5,536 (50%) were males and 5,460 (50%) were females. Population below 6 years was 1,226. The total number of literates in Bagnan was 8,388 (85.85% of the population over 6 years).

 India census, Bagnan had a population of 8,779. Males constitute 51% of the population and females 49%. Bagnan has an average literacy rate of 68%, higher than the national average of 59.5%; with 55% of the males and 45% of females literate. 12% of the population is under 6 years of age.

Education

High schools 
Bagnan High School; established in 1854
 St. Xavier's Public School
 Bagnan Adarsha Balika Vidyalaya; girls school, established in 1964
 Santoshpur Gauranga Vidyapith, established in 1957.
 Mugkalyan High School; in Mugkalyan, established 1866.
 Benapur Chandanapara High School(H.S)
 Bantul Mahakali High School; established at 1916. 
 Chandravag Srikrishna Girl's High School
 Bagnan Girls' High School
 Tenpur Nabasan Anantaram High School
 Nabasan High School 
 Khalore Gopimohan Shikshayataan
 Kalyanpur High School (H.S.)
Bangalpur U. C High SCHOOL (H. S.)
B.N.S. High School,established at 1954
Bangalpur Jyotirmoyee Girls' High School
Deulgram Mankur Bakshi High school

Pre-Primary/KG School
 Bagnan Primary School (Govt), O.T road, near Telephone exchange
 Khalore Kali bari Primary School(Govt), Beside Khalore Maa Kali temple.
 St. Thomas school(Pvt), near registry office, Bagnan
 Notobor memorial Kindergarten School (Pvt.), Chandrapur
 Children's academy(Pvt), near Block Agri office
 Swami Vivekananda School(Pvt), Khalore
 Path Bhawan(Pvt), near Khalore Maa Kali Temple.
 Little Millennium Pre primary(Pvt) - Near Bagnan-II BD Office, Kolapara Kamarshal.
 Chandanapara Children's Academy(Pvt)

Colleges/Universities
There is no University located in Bagnan but there is a College.

 Bagnan College is affiliated to University of Calcutta. The college was founded in July 1958 with only arts faculty. In 1966 the faculty of commerce and in 1974 the faculty of science faculty was added. The college is accredited by the NAAC with B-grade since 2005.

Culture
Khalore Kali Bari Mandir in Bagnan, Howrah is one of the famous Hindu Temples in Khalore,  Bagnan, Howrah, where people from all over Howrah come to worship the Goddess KALI

Deulti

Deulti is located on the banks of the river Rupnarayan. This place is a tourist destination.  Its distance from Kolkata is 50 kilometers. The  immortal storyteller Sarat Chandra Chattopadhyay's house is there. This is also the reason for the attraction.

The railway station 
One of the key features of Bagnan is its railway station. It is by far one of the busiest railway station in South Eastern Railway Zone within West Bengal due to its connectivity to other major places
Station code : BZN
No. of Platforms : 5 (North to south)

References
Web site that provide information about Bagnan

Cities and towns in Howrah district